The Agreement on Port State Measures to Prevent, Deter and Eliminate Illegal, Unreported and Unregulated Fishing (referred to in short as the Port State Measures Agreement (PSMA)) is a 2009 international treaty of the Food and Agriculture Organization (FAO) designed to prevent and eliminate illegal, unreported and unregulated fishing.

Content
The treaty requires that fishing vessels request permission to dock at a port and inform the port of the details of its fishing operations. Permission to dock can be denied if unregulated fishing occurred. The measure is intended to block illegally caught fish from entering the marketplace. Other measures in the treaty include inspections of equipment, paperwork, catches, and ship's records. Though the treaty does not compel countries to apply these measures to ships under their own flags, they may choose to do so under the agreement.

Creation and entry into force
The treaty was concluded on 22 November 2009 at the 36th Session of the FAO Conference held in Rome. Ninety-one states negotiated and agreed to the treaty text. Twenty-three states signed the treaty while it was open for signature in 2009 and 2010.

The treaty entered into force on 5 June 2016, which was 30 days after it was ratified by a 25th state. As of September 2018, the treaty has 55 parties, which includes 54 states plus the European Union:

Five signatory states have not ratified the treaty: Angola, Benin, Brazil, Samoa, and Sierra Leone.

Notes

External links
Text, fao.org.
Signatures and ratifications, fao.org.

Food and Agriculture Organization treaties
Treaties concluded in 2009
Treaties entered into force in 2016
Agreement on Port State Measures to Prevent, Deter and Eliminate Illegal, Unreported and Unregulated Fishing
Fisheries treaties
Treaties of Albania
Treaties of Australia
Treaties of the Bahamas
Treaties of Barbados
Treaties of Cape Verde
Treaties of Chile
Treaties of Costa Rica
Treaties of Cuba
Treaties of Denmark
Treaties of Djibouti
Treaties of Dominica
Treaties entered into by the European Union
Treaties of France
Treaties of Gabon
Treaties of the Gambia
Treaties of Ghana
Treaties of Grenada
Treaties of Guinea
Treaties of Guyana
Treaties of Iceland
Treaties of Indonesia
Treaties of Japan
Treaties of Kenya
Treaties of Madagascar
Treaties of the Maldives
Treaties of Mauritania
Treaties of Mauritius
Treaties of Montenegro
Treaties of Mozambique
Treaties of Myanmar
Treaties of Namibia
Treaties of New Zealand
Treaties of Norway
Treaties of Oman
Treaties of Palau
Treaties of Panama
Treaties of Peru
Treaties of the Philippines
Treaties of Saint Kitts and Nevis
Treaties of Saint Vincent and the Grenadines
Treaties of São Tomé and Príncipe
Treaties of Senegal
Treaties of Seychelles
Treaties of Somalia
Treaties of South Africa
Treaties of South Korea
Treaties of Sri Lanka
Treaties of Sudan
Treaties of Thailand
Treaties of Togo
Treaties of Tonga
Treaties of Turkey
Treaties of the United States
Treaties of Uruguay
Treaties of Vanuatu
Illegal, unreported and unregulated fishing